Sociedade Esportiva Picos, commonly known as Picos, is a Brazilian football club based in Picos, Piauí state. They competed in the Série B once, and in the Série C four times.

Picos is currently ranked fourth among Piauí teams in CBF's national club ranking, at 145th place overall.

History
The club was founded on February 8, 1976. Picos won the Campeonato Piauiense in 1991, 1994, 1997, and in 1998. They competed in the Série B in 1992, and competed in the Série C in 1995, when they were eliminated in the Second Stage, in 1997, when they were eliminated in the First Stage, in 1998, when they were eliminated in the Second Stage by Esporte Clube Limoeiro, and in 2008, when they were eliminated in the Second Stage.

Achievements
 Campeonato Piauiense:
 Winners (4): 1991, 1994, 1997, 1998

Stadium
Sociedade Esportiva Picos play their home games at Estádio Helvídio Nunes. The stadium has a maximum capacity of 5,400 people.

References

Association football clubs established in 1976
Football clubs in Piauí
1976 establishments in Brazil